John Mulcahy (23 November 1918 – 26 April 1962) was an Irish hurler. At club level he played with Éire Óg and was a two-time All-Ireland Championship winner with the Kilkenny senior hurling team.

Playing career

After coming to hurling prominence as a student at CBS Kilkenny, Mulcahy won back-to-back All-Ireland Minor Championships with Kilkenny in 1935 and 1936. He was promoted to the Kilkenny junior side in 1938 and in the following year he won his first senior All-Ireland medal when Kilkenny beat Cork in the "thunder and lightning" final. From 1939 onward Mulcahy was a regular on the senior team and struck up a forward partnership with Seánie O'Brien and Jim Langton. After losing back-to-back finals in 1945 and 1946, he claimed a second senior All-Ireland winners' medal after a defeat of Cork in one of the greatest finals of all in 1947. Mulcahy played in his fifth All-Ireland final in 1950, lining out at full-forward against Tipperary, but Kilkenny were beaten by a point. He retired from inter-county hurling shortly after this, by which time he had also claimed seven Leinster Championships. 

Mulcahy was the holder of four county senior championship medals with Éire Óg and had the distinction of winning county medals in four grades - minor, junior intermediate and senior - in the space of five years. As a referee, Mulcahy took charge of numerous games at club and inter-county level.

Later life and death

Mulcahy worked for some years in the Kilkenny Boot Factory before finding employment as a caretaker at the Kilkenny County Council offices. He died aged 43 on 26 April 1962 after suffering from colon cancer and was survived by his wife and three sons.

Honours

Éire Óg
Kilkenny Senior Hurling Championship (4): 1939, 1944, 1945, 1947
Kilkenny Intermediate Hurling Championship (1): 1937
Kilkenny Junior Hurling Championship (1): 1936
Kilkenny Minor Hurling Championship (3): 1934, 1935, 1936

Kilkenny
All-Ireland Senior Hurling Championship (2): 1939, 1047
Leinster Senior Hurling Championship (7): 1939, 1940, 1943, 1945, 1946, 1947, 1950
All-Ireland Minor Hurling Championship (2): 1935, 1936
Leinster Minor Hurling Championship (2): 1935, 1936

References

1918 births
1962 deaths
Dual players
Éire Óg (Kilkenny) hurlers
Kilkenny inter-county hurlers
Kilkenny Gaelic footballers
All-Ireland Senior Hurling Championship winners
Hurling referees